Richard W. Fitzsimons (January 19, 1922 – January 9, 1991) was an American farmer and politician.

Fitzsimons was born on a farm in Argyle, Marshall County, Minnesota and graduated from the Argyle High School in 1939. He lived in Argyle, Minnesota with his wife and family and was a farmer. Fitzsimons served in the Minnesota House of Representatives from 1953 to 1972 and in the Minnesota Senate from 1973 to 1976. He died from a heart attack at his home in Moorhead, Minnesota.

References

1922 births
1991 deaths
People from Marshall County, Minnesota
Farmers from Minnesota
Members of the Minnesota House of Representatives
Minnesota state senators